Ripred is an abnormally large rat and capable fighter who appears in Suzanne Collins' The Underland Chronicles. He is an important character in all five of the series' books. Ripred is what many people and animals in the Underland refer to as a "rager", or a natural born killer. Even though he is a rat, or a gnawer, as the Underlanders say, he often fights alongside the humans - frequently against other rats. Ripred is usually sarcastic, snide, and overbearing, but he has occasionally shown compassion and tenderness, especially with the main character's younger sister, Lizzie. The books describe him as being just as large as the other six-foot rats of the Underland, having a gray coat, and is marked by a diagonal scar across his face.

History and background
Ripred is one of the older characters in the series as he has known the human King and Queen of Regalia for many years. Ripred once had a mate and several pups. During one of the rare peaceful periods between rats and humans, they shared a beautiful garden filled with apple trees and other delicious fruit. It was called the Garden of Hesperides. One day while many rats were enjoying the garden, the humans, led by Solovet and her son Hamnet, launched a surprise attack. In an effort to protect them from the attack, the rats herded the pups into caves surrounding the garden. Hoping to wipe out the rats completely, the humans destroyed the dike holding back the water and began to drown the rats and pups in the garden and surrounding caves.
Though Ripred survived this attack, he decided that the constant warring between rats and humans in the Underland was pointless. These events all transpired before the main character, Gregor, had discovered the Underland.

The first time Ripred appears in the series is in the first book, Gregor the Overlander, to act as a guide for Gregor and other characters attempting to find and rescue Gregor's father from the rats. He fulfills the role of "one gnawer beside", as the Prophecy of Grey foretold. Ripred's goal in this quest was to overthrow the rats' monstrous king, King Gorger, and attempt to gain power.

Ripred appears again in Gregor and the Prophecy of Bane to deliver Twitchtip, another outcast rat with an incredible sense of smell, to Gregor for an upcoming quest. He later attempts to teach Gregor the skill of echolocation, but with poor results. At the end of the book, he takes in the Bane after it was revealed that the Bane was just a rat pup.

In the third book, Gregor and the Curse of the Warmbloods, Ripred convinces Gregor to come back down to the Underland for a brief meeting regarding a plague that threatens to wipe all the warmbloods of the Underland out. He ends up being a representative of the rats on a quest to find a cure for the plague, a plant called starshade, in a treacherous jungle. During the trip Ripred is usually condescending and mocking towards Gregor, but he also helps Gregor cope with being a rager like him and is important to the group discovering that the starshade is indeed not the real cure.

By the fourth book, Gregor and the Marks of Secret, Ripred has been giving Gregor regular echolocation lessons that do little good and often end up in the rat insulting Gregor. When Gregor meets Ripred in the cave under the human city of Regalia for his lesson one day, he has brought along the Bane. which has now reached a stage in its growth like adolescence. When  Gregor and other characters find Ripred being starved in a deep pit in rat territory later, his front teeth locked together painfully, Ripred tells them that he was put there on the Bane's orders from him to die and he accompanies the group through other dangerous lands as they attempt to rescue the nibblers, or mice, of the Underland from genocide by the rats.

In the final volume of the series, Gregor and the Code of Claw, Ripred is portrayed as helping humans to command their troops as they fight against the Bane and his followers in a brutal war. Ripred also meets Gregor's younger sister, Lizzie, for the first time, as Lizzie has never been to the Underland before. Lizzie reminds Ripred of his deceased pup Silksharp, and calms her in stressful moments. He shows much more care and compassion to Lizzie than Gregor has ever seen the rat show before. He is believed to be devoured by mites but returns as the representative for the rats during the surrender negotiations.

The peacemaker
During Gregor and the Code of Claw, Ripred uses the following prophecy, written by Bartholomew of Sandwich, to his advantage, after he half-denies half-accepts in modesty. It is carved on a wall, in the corner of the prophecy room in the Regalian palace.

On soft feet, by none detected,
Dealing death, by most rejected,
Killed by claw, since resurrected,
Marked by X, two lines connected.
Finally, they intersected.
Two lines met, one unexpected.

Ripred received a wound crossing an old scar, using it in order to convince the Underlanders that he should be the rats' representative in the post-war peace talks. He is successful in convincing most, with the notable exception of Queen Luxa, and they go on to consider the prophecy fulfilled.

Relationships with other characters

Rats
Ripred is in general recognized by most rats as an outcast. He does, however, live with a small band of rats away from others, and appeared to be on good terms with Lapblood and Mange, rats who also represented their species in the quest for a cure to the plague in the third book. He overthrows the rat king, King Gorger, in the first book, in hopes of gaining power or instating a ruler who will strive for peace between rats and the other species of the Underland. He later reveals to Gregor that he doesn't really want to be king, but instead that the warring end. 
Ripred and his band of rats try to raise the Bane, with poor results. He says that the Bane's father, Snare, had already left his mark on the pup by the time he got him. The Bane despises Ripred, because he believes the rat treated him unfairly as he was growing up and was hurt by his constant sneers and insults. The Bane and his followers have Ripred left in a deep pit to die, but he is rescued by Gregor and other characters and helps rally other rats to fight against the Bane.
At negotiations after the war in the fifth book, Ripred returns alive against what all humans thought and steps forward as a representative for the rats.

Humans
In the earlier books, Gregor notes that Ripred seems to be friends with Vikus and Solovet, prominent leaders of the humans. Although Ripred does ally himself with humans in hopes of peace, he does often appear on less-than-perfect terms with them. Gregor is puzzled by Ripred's attitude towards Hamnet, a human who used to be part of the Regalian military, because he was in part responsible for the destruction of the Garden of Hesperides and so the death of Ripred's mate and pups. Hamnet did, in fact, deeply regret his actions and even ran away from Regalia to the jungle after the battle, only to resurface ten years later at the Arch of Tantalus as a guide for the party seeking the cure to the plague.

Gregor

Ripred usually has a rude and sarcastic tone with Gregor, but can sometimes be helpful and understanding with Gregor and has sometimes shown kindness. He eventually manages to help him control his rager abilities and finally grasp echolocation. After Ripred is presumed dead in the fifth book, Gregor regrets that he never got to tell Ripred how much he admired him, even though oftentimes in the past he has been very mad at Ripred for things and even considered killing him once. In the third book it is stated by Hamnet that Ripred adores Gregor, though it is thought that this was said in sarcasm or in jest.

Lizzie

When Lizzie is around, Ripred is far less snide and even comforts her once when she has a panic attack. He lets Lizzie ride on him and lay on his back and tells her things that the other characters don't know about him, including his family and their death. Lizzie is grief-stricken after she believes him dead and feels that it was her fault. During the battle she and her younger sister Boots were drawn in danger, and Ripred scales a wall to save them. Lizzie blames herself because she says he wanted her near the battle so he could protect her the way he couldn't protect Silksharp, one of his pups who had the same personality as Lizzie, hence their close relationship. After his return, the two are reunited much with Lizzie's excitement.

As a rager
Ripred tells Gregor that it took him a few years to get his rager abilities under control. Throughout the series he demonstrates that he has clearly mastered them and is an extremely dangerous opponent in battle. Ripred often uses a spin attack for defense and offense, where he spins so quickly that anything that gets near his claws or teeth is shredded, a method once used by Gregor when he was fighting twisters (snakes). He does not claim to be invincible, however, and says “I start to crack at about four hundred to one."

References

The Underland Chronicles
Fictional mice and rats
Fictional war veterans
Literary characters introduced in 2003
Male characters in literature